Shambhunath is a town in Nepal. Sambhunath or Shambhunath may also refer to
Shambhunath Temple in Shambhunath, Nepal
Sambhunath College in West Bengal, India
Shambhunath Institute of Engineering and Technology in Uttar Pradesh, India
Sambhunath (given name)